John Julius Thomas Stewart (6 January 1910 – 19 September 1972) was an Australian politician. He was a Labor Party member of the New South Wales Legislative Assembly from 1957 to 1972, representing the electorates of Kahibah (1957–71) and Charlestown (1971–72).

Early life
Stewart was born to parents Charles Thomas Stewart, a Caulker, and Mary Jane Sheen. Stewart jnr was educated at Wickham and Cooks Hill Boys' High School. He apprenticed to boilermaking at Walsh Island Government dockyard in Newcastle.

After a long period of unemployment in the 1930s Great Depression, Stewart married Eileen Dorothy Chillinsworth on 4 December 1950 to whom they had one son. He was a Freemason.

Politics
Stewart joined the Labor Party in 1926. He was a member of the Hamilton, Adamstown and Dudley-Redhead branches. He was President of Kahabah state electoral council.

Stewart won Labor pre-selection for the Electoral district of Kahibah and contested and won the seat at the 1957 by-election, following the death of Independent member Tom Armstrong. He won re-election at the 1959, 1962, 1965, and 1968 elections. With abolition of the seat of Kahibah at the 1971 election, Stewart switched seats to the nearby seat of Charlestown. He won the seat but died shortly after the election.

Death
His funeral was held at Beresfield crematorium by Adamstown Methodist Church ministers.

References

 

1910 births
1972 deaths
Members of the New South Wales Legislative Assembly
Australian boilermakers
Australian Labor Party members of the Parliament of New South Wales
20th-century Australian politicians